was a Japanese manufacturer of railway rolling stock that existed from 1896 to 1972. 

 1899: Factory opened in Osaka.
The two plants were reorganized as the Osaka Head Office and the Tokyo Branch.
 1912: Becomes  after corporate restructuring.
 1936: Head office moved to Tokyo; Osaka Head Office becomes Osaka Branch.
 1944: The two branches (factories) renamed Osaka Works and Tokyo Works respectively.
 1968: Construction of railway wagon factory in Utsunomiya.
 1972: Merged with Kawasaki Heavy Industries.

Preserved Kisha Seizō Locomotives

Further reading

References 

Locomotive manufacturers of Japan
Rolling stock manufacturers of Japan
Defunct companies of Japan
Japanese  companies established in 1896